Captain Lord Hugh William Grosvenor (6 April 1884 – 30 October 1914) was a son of Hugh Grosvenor, 1st Duke of Westminster and his second wife, formerly The Hon. Katherine Cavendish.

WWI service and death
Grosvenor was the commander of C Squadron, 1st Life Guards, and was killed in action, aged thirty, during World War I.

Lord Hugh's unit deployed at Zandvoorde and participated in the First Battle of Ypres. In an exposed position for six days they held the shallow trench in front of Zandvoorde on the forward slope. Grosvenor sent a message back to his headquarters -

The British trenches were attacked and the cavalry fighting as infantry was overwhelmed in hand-to-hand fighting. By 08.30 on the morning of 30 October 1914 news reached HQ that the 7th Cavalry Brigade had been forced off the Zandvoorde Ridge. With no survivors there was initially some confusion as to Lord Grosvenor's fate.

The 1st Life Guard's war diary noted the action at Zandvoorde -

He was initially reported as being made a prisoner of war. The Times reported a comrade stating that Lord Grosvenor was wounded and his horse killed following a 'gallant charge to draw the fire of the German field batteries'. After the withdrawal of the Life Guards he was believed captured after failing to mount a second horse. However, he was later believed to have been killed in action on 30 October 1914 rather than captured as initially thought.

Having no known grave, he is commemorated on the Menin Gate Memorial, Ypres.

Family
He married Lady Mabel Crichton, daughter of John Crichton, 4th Earl Erne and his wife, the former Lady Florence Cole, daughter of William Cole, 3rd Earl of Enniskillen, on 21 April 1906.

Children of Lord and Lady Hugh Grosvenor:
Gerald Hugh Grosvenor (1907–1967), later 4th Duke of Westminster
Robert George Grosvenor (1910–1979), later 5th Duke of Westminster

Polo
He was one of a number of British polo players who died in World War I.

References

1884 births
1914 deaths
British Life Guards officers
British Army personnel of World War I
British military personnel killed in World War I
Younger sons of dukes
Hugh